Pseudopieris nehemia, the clean mimic-white, is a butterfly in the family Pieridae. It is found from Mexico to Brazil and Argentina. The habitat consists of rainforests and transitional cloudforests.

Subspecies
The following subspecies are recognised:
Pseudopieris nehemia nehemia (Brazil)
Pseudopieris nehemia aequatorialis (C. & R. Felder, 1861) (Bolivia, Peru)
Pseudopieris nehemia limbalis Röber, 1924 (Brazil: Pará)
Pseudopieris nehemia prasina Hayward, 1949 (Argentina)
Pseudopieris nehemia francisca Lamas, 1979 (Honduras)
Pseudopieris nehemia irma Lamas, 1979 (Guatemala)
Pseudopieris nehemia luisa Lamas, 1979 (Panama)
Pseudopieris nehemia melania Lamas, 1985 (Peru)
Pseudopieris nehemia jessica Lamas, 2004 (Peru)
Pseudopieris nehemia mariana Lamas, 2004 (Peru)

References

Dismorphiinae
Butterflies described in 1836
Fauna of Brazil
Pieridae of South America
Taxa named by Jean Baptiste Boisduval